The Atlanta Fantasy Fair (AFF) was a multigenre convention which took place once each summer in Atlanta, Georgia from 1975 to 1995. Organized by A.C.F.F., Ltd., the convention was a nonprofit entity designed to promote the fantasy genre in the American Southeast. Over its two-decade run, the AFF featured hundreds of guests, encompassed hotels in downtown Atlanta and ran thousands of hours of programming for fans of science fiction, fantasy, comic books, and other elements of fandom.

Most AFFs took place over three days, from Friday to Sunday. The convention featured a large range of pop culture elements, primarily comic books but also science fiction/fantasy, film/television, animation, anime, manga, toys, horror, and collectible card games. Along with panels, seminars, and workshops with industry professionals, the AFF often featured previews of upcoming films, and such evening events as a costume contest. The convention featured a large floorspace for exhibitors, including comic book dealers and collectibles merchants.

The Atlanta Fantasy Fair was a family-friendly event that worked on a "membership" basis, which enabled attendees to gain admittance to the show for the entire weekend. The show was known for its program booklet (titled Visions) and for the annual presentation of the Atlanta Fantasy Fair Award for Outstanding Achievement.

History 
The Atlanta Comics & Fantasy Fair was founded in 1975 by Harley Anton, Lamar Waldron, and Gary Cook. The first convention was held July 22–24, 1975, at the Ramada Inn and Conference Center located near Interstate 85 and Monroe Drive. The guest of honor was Marvel Comics figurehead Stan Lee. The convention offices were in Morrow, Georgia.

Dr. Kenneth Smith, a local fantasy illustrator, small-press publisher, and philosophy professor, was a guest of every show from 1975 until 1988, when a dispute with an attendee led to him leaving and not coming back.

By 1977 the co-chairmen of the convention were Harley Anton, Gary Cook, and Lamar Waldron.

By 1982, the convention was officially being organized as a nonprofit through the organization Atlanta Comics & Fantasy Fair, Ltd. In 1984, the AFF headquarters were in Marietta, Georgia.

Waldron was displaced as convention chair after the 1986 convention. Terry (alternately spelled as "Terri") Loggins was convention president from 1986–1989. In 1989, the AFF headquarters were in Norcross, Georgia.

The Atlanta Fantasy Fair, Inc. registered as a Georgia Domestic Non-Profit Corporation on August 12, 1991. Their headquarters were in Stockbridge, Georgia, and the two principals were listed as CEO (Felton) Wayne Loggins and CFO David Denton.

By the early 1990s, attendance at AFF was declining, in many ways due to competition with the also Atlanta-based Dragon Con (est. 1987), as well as the collapse of the comic speculator market. The quality of guests began to decline and the show petered out in 1995.

Former Atlanta Fantasy Fair co-organizer Wayne Loggins attempted to rebrand the convention the next year, producing Atlanta StarCon & Comics on November 1–3, 1996. Held at the Atlanta Marriott North Central Hotel, the show boasted such guests as George Pérez, Michael O'Hare, Kane Hodder, Frank Marshall, and Kathleen Kennedy. Programming included a party at Planet Hollywood, a masquerade contest, meals "with the stars," a dealer room, and gaming. The show was not enough of a success to continue the following year.

Dates and locations

Visions 
From 1979 to 1987, the convention produced Visions, a program booklet given out to convention attendees. Each issue of the AFF zine highlighted that year's special guests, publishing biographies and checklists of their work. Each issue also featured pinup illustrations by professional and amateur artists. Visions was published by convention organizers Gary Cook and Lamar Waldron, and then, beginning with issue #4 (1982), under the name Atlanta Comics & Fantasy Fair, Ltd. Visions was edited by Lamar Waldron and was typically  in size.

Visions #1 (1979) features the first appearance of Bob Burden's Flaming Carrot. Visions #3 (1981) contains an extremely rare early Flaming Carrot story by Burden.

The AFF published 4,000 copies of Visions #4 (1982), which contained a Frank Miller Batman pinup, a Miller checklist, a Forrest J Ackerman article written by Robert Bloch, artwork by Ray Harryhausen and Will Eisner, and the fourth appearance of Burden's Flaming Carrot.

Visions #5 featured checklists of the books of Robert Bloch and Larry Niven, and "Remembering Boris Karloff" by Forrest J Ackerman. The cover depicted model Susan Barrow (a.k.a. Susie the Floozie).

Atlanta Fantasy Fair Awards 
In 1982 the Atlanta Fantasy Fair Award for Outstanding Achievement was established, bestowed for lifetime achievement in the fields of science fiction, fantasy, horror, comics, and related fields in any medium. The prize (sculpted by Edward Knox) was a sterling silver statuette of "Miss Fantasy Fair," with an elaborate headdress and a diamond in one eye.

Winners were required to be present to claim the award, or it would pass to the next choice. The inaugural recipient was science fiction and fantasy fan, spokesman, and promoter Forrest J Ackerman.

References

External links 
 Atlanta Fantasy Fair tribute site
 
 Atlanta Fantasy Fair cosplay video footage, 1989

Defunct multigenre conventions
Defunct science fiction conventions in the United States
Defunct gaming conventions
Defunct comics conventions
Culture of Atlanta
Recurring events established in 1975
Tourist attractions in Atlanta
Conventions in Atlanta